José María Albareda Herrera (Caspe, 15 April 1902 - 26 February 1966, Madrid) was a Spanish soil scientist and science administrator. From its 1939 creation by Francoist Spain to his 1966 death, he was the secretary general and head of the Higher Council of Scientific Research (CSIC), the main Spanish scientific institution. 

He was one of the first numerary members of the Opus Dei (from 1937) and was a close friend of its founder, Josemaría Escrivá. He was ordained a priest in 1959. In 1960, he was appointed the first president of the University of Navarra.

References

Opus Dei members
Spanish scientists
1902 births
1966 deaths
Commanders Crosses of the Order of Merit of the Federal Republic of Germany
Spanish Roman Catholic priests
Catholic clergy scientists